Andrea Greene (born 12 May 1988) is a Chilean former field hockey player who played as a forward.

Personal life
Greene was born and raised in Santiago, Chile.

Career

Under–21
Greene made her debut for the Chile U–21 team at the 2008 Pan American Championship in Mexico City, where she won a silver medal.

The following year she appeared at the 2009 FIH Junior World Cup in Boston.

Las Diablas
Greene made her debut for Las Diablas in 2008, at the South American Championship in Montevideo. After her debut, Greene had a five-year hiatus from the national team. 

In 2013, Greene returned to the national team for the 2013 edition of the South American Championship in Santiago. She went on to represent the team later that year during the Round 2 and Semi-Final events of the 2012–13 Women's FIH World League, held in Rio de Janeiro and Rotterdam, respectively.

She made her final appearance in 2015 during a test series against South Africa in Cape Town.

References

External links

1988 births
Living people
Female field hockey forwards
Chilean female field hockey players
Sportspeople from Santiago
20th-century Chilean women
21st-century Chilean women